Ranko Munitić (Zagreb, 3 April 1943 – Belgrade, 28 March 2009) was a theorist, critic, journalist and art historian – one of the most important experts on popular culture and media in Yugoslavia.

His fields of interest were most usually Yugoslav film, cinematographic animation, comics, documentary film, artistic fantasy, television, acting and actors.

He was also a film and television screenwriter, director, host and producer.

Biography 
Ranko Munitić was born during the World War II on 3 April 1943 in Zagreb, which was then in the Independent State of Croatia. As a child he lived in Trogir. He studied history of art at the Faculty of Philosophy in Zagreb.

He met Zorica Jevremović (a director, dramatist, theorist of media and culture) at the amateur film festival "Mala Pula", on 24 June 1968. The two of them married in Belgrade on 1 May 1971, where Zorica added the surname Munitić to hers, then they went to Zagreb. In November of the same year, they return to Belgrade, where they lived together until the end of March 2009 (when Munitić died).

Work
Munitić first article was published in high school magazine Polet in May 1961. He published first professional article in the magazine for art and culture Telegram, in November 1962. Since then he publishes critiques, essays, bigger studies and was an author of more than 70 monographs. His fields of interest were most commonly Yugoslav film, cinematographic animation, comics, documentary film, artistic fantasy, television, acting and actors.

First time he appeared as a scenarist in film "Traveling Cinema" (1964). He wrote screenplays for animated and documentary movies, television shows, and he cooperated on several screenplays for featured movies. Also wrote a screenplay for Dejan Šorak film "Officer with a Rose" (1987).

As a member of the board of directors of ASIFA (International Animated Film Association) he participated in the seventies and eighties in the global enterprise of popularization and promotion of cinematographic animation. He was a member of juries and committees at about twenty festivals of short and animated films all around the world. He edited hundreds of retrospectives of Yugoslav films abroad, especially of Zagreb School of Animated Films and Belgrade school of documentary films.

Since 1960s he participates in the main TV shows on films in Zagreb and Belgrade, and since 1980s he created, for TV studio of Novi Sad, eighty one-hour portraits of leading actors in his own series "Night with Stars" ("Veče sa zvezdama").

Ethnically, he sometimes called himself a Hrbin ("Croat-Serb"). About his personal identity he said:

His destiny he defined in this manner:

Since December 2011 in Belgrade was open the Media Center "Ranko Munitić" founded by Zorica Jevremović Munitić. Since April 2012 the Center establishes award "Twinkler from Trogir" ̶ "Trepetalo iz Trogira – Regional award for the media Ranko Munitić". Since then it was awarded to Nedeljko Dragić, Puriša Đorđević, Dušan Makavejev, Lordan Zafranović and Karpo Aćimović Godina.

Within the Center, since December 2012, a quarterly multilingual regional magazine for media and culture Mediantrop, targeting the South European region, is being published.

Bibliography (books)

Filmography (partial) 

Director
 Traveling Theater (Putujući kino) (1964)

Screenwriter
 Traveling Theater (Putujući kino) (1964) 
 Time of Vampires (Vrijeme vampira) (1971) 
 Officer with Rose (Oficir s ružom) (1987) 
 Pavle Vuisić (Pavle Vuisić) 1926–1988 (1997) 
 Danilo Bata Stojković – Film Accomplishments (Danilo Bata Stojković – filmska ostvarenja) (1999) 
 Dušica Žegarac – Film Accomplishments (Dušica Žegarac – filmska ostvarenja), (2000) 
 Aleksandar Berček – Film Accomplishments (Aleksandar Berček – filmska ostvarenja), (2002) 
 Bora Todorović – Film Accomplishments (Bora Todorović – filmska ostvarenja) (2003) 

Night with stars – Veče sa zvezdama (complete author)

TV documentary series of 80 one-hour episodes dedicated to important Serbian actors and actresses, a kind of Critique Pantheon, Hall of Glory of our actors' scene. Production and broadcasting: TV Novi Sad 1990–1997.

References

External links 

 Media center Ranko Munitić, Belgrade
 "A Man Who Loved Film" (Čovek koji je voleo film) ("Politika", 27. mart 2011)

1943 births
2009 deaths
Journalists from Zagreb
Mass media theorists
Cultural historians
Comics critics
Serbian screenwriters
Male screenwriters
Serbian journalists
Serbian non-fiction writers
Serbian writers
Serbian film critics
Serbian film directors
Serbian film producers
Croatian screenwriters
Croatian non-fiction writers
Croatian writers
Croatian film critics
Croatian film directors
Croatian film producers
Film historians
20th-century screenwriters
20th-century journalists